Andrea Neto from the TU Delft- Delft University of Technology, Delft, Netherlands was named Fellow of the Institute of Electrical and Electronics Engineers (IEEE) in 2016 for contributions to dielectric lens antennas and wideband arrays.

References

Fellow Members of the IEEE
Living people
Year of birth missing (living people)
Place of birth missing (living people)
Dutch electrical engineers